Broken English were a British rock band formed in 1987 by Steve Elson (singer and guitarist), who at the time performed in a Rolling Stones tribute band.

History 
The group started after Elson wrote a song called "Comin' On Strong", which a friend of his Oliver Smallman, heard the song and thought it was too good to be a one-off novelty song and encouraged Elson to put together a band and record more material. The first single did reasonably well; however, the two follow-up singles did not fare so well. This is highlighted and detailed in the sleeve notes of their only album which was released in 2007, several years after the band stopped performing. 

Broken English were one of the opening acts on the ITV programme The Roxy, which was set up as opposition to BBC Television's Top of the Pops.

Music videos
Comin on Strong features a full-length music video of the band in their Ghostbusters look, playing the song in a run down work yard. Due to the visible steam of their breath, the video gives the impression that the band is in the cold outdoors.

Love on the Side Has a desert/cowboy theme with the band performing with their guitars. The closing shot shows the band departing up hill into the sunset, where they cross paths with three others dressed in the bands Ghostbusters uniforms.

Do You Really Want Me Back shows the band playing in a studio and is filmed in black and white. The video consists of a woman de icing a window allowing her to observe the band performing.  At the end of the video the band appears in the style of the Take On Me video by A-ha.

Band members
 Steve Elson - guitars, vocals (now lead singer 'Nick Dagger' of The Counterfeit Stones
 Jamie Moses - guitars (has performed with Queen + Paul Rodgers, Brian May, Tom Jones and Paul Young)
 Alan Coates - guitars (used to perform with The Hollies)
 Paul Fenton - drums (used to perform with T.Rex)
 Geoff Cooper - drums (used to perform with The Counterfeit Stones)

Discography

Albums
Broken English recorded one album (called Platinum), which was not released until 2007, nearly 20 years after it was first recorded. The album's sleeve notes give a detailed history of the band and reasons for them slipping into obscurity.

 The Rough with the Smooth (2007)
Track listing 
 "Show a Little Mercy"  
 "Straight Lace Girls"  
 "Don't Change"  
 "Emotional Suicide"  
 "You Take Me Away"  
 "Comin' On Strong"  
 "Casanova"  
 "Ball 'n' Chain" 
 "Love on the Side"  
 "Woman of Stone"  
 "Do You Really Want Me Back"

Bonus tracks 
 "Comin' On Strong (2)"  
 "Fire Me Up"  
 "Rough Cut Diamonds"  
 "Running Out"

Singles

Popular culture
The band's only hit "Comin' On Strong", appears in the video game Grand Theft Auto V
The song appears on the ingame radio station "Los Santos Rock Radio" and is used as brief cutscene soundtrack for the closing "heist complete" screen in multiplayer for the first heist "The Fleeca job" playing  in a bar while the two customizable player characters drink beer.

References
 Guinness Book of British Hit Singles - 16th Edition -

External links
 Jamie Moses website
 The Counterfeit Stones website
 [ Broken English AMG entry]

English rock music groups
Musical groups established in 1987
EMI Records artists